Pabstiella stictophylla is a species of orchid plant native to Brazil.

References 

stictophylla
Flora of Brazil